Jane's World was a comic strip by cartoonist Paige Braddock that ran from March 1998 to October 2018. Featuring lesbian and bisexual women characters, the strip stars Jane Wyatt, a young lesbian living in a trailer in Northern California with her straight male roommate, Ethan, and follows her life with her circle of friends, romances, and exes. Shortly after celebrating its 20th anniversary, publication ended with Jane marrying Dorothy.

The comic strip is notable for being the first gay-themed comic work to receive online distribution by a national newspaper syndicate in the United States. In 2006, Paige Braddock was nominated for an Eisner Award as Best Writer/Artist–Humor for Jane's World.

Comic strip
Braddock created Jane's World so that women, particularly lesbians, would have a comic strip character that they could relate to, though it's meant to be accessible to a wider audience. Braddock devised Jane in 1991 but never actually put her onto paper until 1998, and began publishing on the Internet in late March.

In 2001, United Media's Comics.com website picked up reprints of Jane's World, making it the first gay-themed work to receive distribution by a national media syndicate.

In April 2002, it was picked up for print syndication by United Media's United Feature Syndicate. They began publishing new works in 2007. 

In addition to web and newspaper publication, Braddock published the strip in a comic book format through her own publication house, "Girl Twirl Comics". The trade paperback versions feature covers created by different artists.

Characters

Jane's World characters are all friends, to various degrees, and romantic interests of Jane; along with the occasional ex-girlfriend, coworker, and boss in the mix.

Jane
The protagonist of Jane’s World is Jane Wyatt. Her middle name, Tiberius, was given by her dad, a Star Trek fan. She is a white, soft butch, lesbian, who is in and out of jobs, in and out of housing, in and out of comical blunders and cosmic dimensions, and in and out of relationships. Jane has run-ins with exes as well as the Log Cabin Republicans, The Star League of The Last Starfighter, Amazon Island, zombies, to name a few.

Rusty
Jane's mixed-breed dog. He has a brown ring around his left eye. The comic strip begins with a Rusty storyline that introduces Jane and her circle of friends and family.

Dorothy
Jane's best friend, and on-again, off-again girlfriend. Dorothy runs the coffee shop, Hard Drive Cafe, where many of the comic strip's plots take place. Unbeknownst to either of them, their mothers tried to play matchmakers and arranged for Jane and Dorothy to get together one evening. Things heated up between them but Jane became confused after Skye showed her some interest. The comic strip concludes with Jane and Dorothy getting married.

Ethan
Jane's straight male roommate and best dude. Their romantic relationships with women often get in the way of their friendship. Ethan has a gay brother named Julian.

Chelle
Chelle is visually reminiscent of Trinity in The Matrix. She rides a motorcycle, has a special ops background, and a past she is trying to get away from. Despite her coolness, Chelle dates Jane, and remains a good friend post breakup.

Dorrie
Jane's co-worker at The Daily News and friend. Dorrie is African American, a lesbian, and has a crush on Chelle.

Archie
Jane's co-worker at The Daily News and friend. Archie is Asian American, straight, and is not amused by Jane's antics at work or in her relationships.

Skye
One of Jane's love interests who works at The Garden of Vegan diner. She unsuccessfully tries to get Jane to eat healthier while they're dating. She's also a surfer.

Jill

Chelle's on-again, off-again girlfriend. She was Chelle's former partner on the police force, and prior to that, a United States Navy diver. She is often portrayed as Jane's nemesis. Jill never has a problem attracting women.

Talia
An ex-girlfriend of Jane's that pops in and out of the strip. She's bisexual and went to college with Jane.

Bud
Jane's laid-back cousin and car mechanic.

Shallow Breast Guy 
Based on cartoonist Stephan Pastis, creator of Pearls Before Swine, this character appears only occasionally as a breast-obsessed, straight male.  Shallow Breast Guy is drawn to look like Pastis.  He once took control of the strip and drew Jane's World in the style of Pearls Before Swine, endowing the women with large breasts and portraying them as hyper-sexualized, thereby earning his nickname. In turn, Pastis has featured Braddock's wiener dog Andy (and, less frequently, Olive) in his strip.

Books
Love Letters to Jane's World, Lion Forge, 2018
Jane's World: The Case of the Mail Order Bride, Bold Strokes Books, 2016
Jane's World, Volume 11, Girl Twirl Comics, 2014
Jane's World, Volume 10, The New Frontier, Girl Twirl Comics, 2011
Jane's World, Volume 9, Girl Twirl Comics, 2009 
Jane's World, Volume 8, Girl Twirl Comics, 2008
Jane's World, Collection 1 (first 15 issues), Girl Twirl Comics, 2007
Jane's World, Volume 7, Girl Twirl Comics, 2007 
Jane's World, Volume 6, Girl Twirl Comics, 2006 
Jane's World, Volume 5, Girl Twirl Comics, 2006 
Jane's World, Volume 4, Girl Twirl Comics, 2006 
Jane's World, Volume 3, Girl Twirl Comics, 2005 
Jane's World, Volume 2, Girl Twirl Comics, 2004 
Jane's World, Volume 1, Girl Twirl Comics, 2003

See also
 List of female comics creators
 List of feminist comic books
 List of webcomics with LGBT characters
 Dykes to Watch Out For
 Hothead Paisan: Homicidal Lesbian Terrorist
 Wimmen's Comix

References

Further reading

Paige Braddock
 
 
 
 
 
 
 

Miscellaneous

External links
Jane's World at GoComics
Paige Braddock's website
 
  (book review)

1998 webcomic debuts
2018 webcomic endings
1990s webcomics
2000s webcomics
2010s webcomics
1990s LGBT literature
2000s LGBT literature
2010s LGBT literature
Comics about women
Feminist comics
Fictional lesbians
Lesbian feminist mass media
Lesbian fiction
Lesbian-related comics
LGBT-related webcomics
Lesbian-related mass media in the United States
LGBT literature in the United States